Fannie Jean Gaston-Johansson (1938-2023) was an American professor of nursing and university distinguished professor at Johns Hopkins University. Gaston-Johansson researched health disparities, pain management, and coping strategies in women breast cancer patients. Gaston-Johansson was the first African-American woman tenured full professor at Johns Hopkins University. She previously served as a dean and full professor at University of Gothenburg and an associate professor at University of Nebraska Medical Center. Gaston-Johansson was named a Living Legend of the American Academy of Nursing in 1995.

Early life and education 
Fannie Gaston-Johansson was born in 1938 in Hickory, North Carolina. In 1959, she completed a Bachelor of Science in Nursing at Winston-Salem State University. She earned a Master of Science in Nursing in medical, surgical, and psychiatric nursing from University of California, San Francisco in 1963. In 1985, Gaston-Johansson completed a Ph.D. in nursing at the University of Gothenburg.

Career 
In 1959, Gaston-Johansson began working as a staff nurse at Veterans Administration hospitals in New York, Texas, and California. She joined the faculty at San Francisco State University in 1964 as an instructor and chair of the curriculum committee. In 1966, Gaston-Johansson took a leave of absence to study at Uppsala University. She joined Winston-Salem State University in 1967 as an assistant professor of nursing and chair of the curriculum committee. In 1970, Gaston-Johansson joined the thoracic surgery and coronary care unit at Sahlgrenska University Hospital as a staff nurse. The next year, she transferred to the general medical surgical units and thorax where she remained until 1973. In 1974, she became assistant professor at Quinsigamond Community College. In 1975, she became a clinical instructor at Sahlgrenska University Hospital. In 1977, Gaston-Johansson became faculty and head teacher at the Vardskolan Annedal School of Nursing. She returned to University of Gothenburg in 1979 as a study leader in the department of nursing.

In 1985, Gaston-Johansson joined University of Nebraska Medical Center (UNMC) as an assistant professor and became an associate professor a year later. She was a visiting professor at University of Gothenburg in June 1988. Gaston-Johansson served as the director of nursing research in clinical practice at UNMC in the Nursing Department/Nursing Administration from 1987 to 1989. In 1990, Gaston-Johansson was coordinator and chair of a $50,000 grant from the Robert Wood Johnson Foundation to develop an innovative program for patient care. In 1991, she became the director of nursing research and quality improvement.

In 1993, Gaston-Johansson joined Johns Hopkins School of Nursing as an associate professor and Elsie M. Lawler Chair in Research. She served as the director of the post masters nurse practitioner program. In 1995, Gaston-Johansson was promoted to director of the international and extramural academic programs. She was a visiting professor at University of Washington. In 1997, she began a joint appointment in oncology at the Johns Hopkins School of Medicine. She was promoted to full professor in the school of nursing in 1998. She was the first African-American woman to become a tenured full professor at Johns Hopkins University. While maintaining her appointments at Johns Hopkins, Gaston-Johansson returned to University of Gothenburg first as a visiting professor in 1999 before becoming full professor there in 2000. Gaston-Johansson helped create a doctoral nursing program and was a dean from 2001 to 2005. In 2007, she became the inaugural chair of the acute and chronic care department at Johns Hopkins School of Nursing. She led the Minority Global Health Disparities Research Training Program where she researched health disparities across the lifespan. Gaston-Johansson investigated late in life health issues and pain management in patients with terminal or chronic illnesses. She also researched coping strategies in women with breast cancer. Gaston-Johansson retired in June 2014. She became a professor emerita and university distinguished professor upon her retirement.

Awards and honors 
Gaston-Johansson was a fellow of the American Academy of Nursing and the American Academy of Pain Management. She was named a Living Legend of the American Academy of Nursing in 1995. She received citations from the United States Congress and the Government of Sweden for her international research. In 2011, Sigma Theta Tau inducted Gaston-Johansson into the International Nurse Researcher Hall of Fame.

Personal life 
Gaston-Johansson was previously married to pathologist Sonny Johansson. Their son, Christian S. Johansson, a government official, was raised in Sweden and Omaha, Nebraska.

See also 

 Women in nursing
 List of African-American firsts
 List of American women's firsts
Timeline of women in science

References 

1938 births
People from Hickory, North Carolina
Winston-Salem State University alumni
University of California, San Francisco alumni
University of Gothenburg alumni
Academic staff of the University of Gothenburg
University of Nebraska Medical Center faculty
San Francisco State University faculty
Winston-Salem State University faculty
Johns Hopkins University faculty
Fellows of the American Academy of Nursing
African-American nurses
American expatriate academics
American expatriates in Sweden
American women nurses
Nursing researchers
African-American women academics
American women academics
African-American academics
20th-century American women scientists
21st-century American women scientists
Women deans (academic)
Nursing school deans
Living people
20th-century African-American women
20th-century African-American scientists
21st-century African-American women
21st-century African-American scientists